The national emblem of Bhutan (Dzongkha: རྒྱལ་ཡོངས་ལས་རྟགས་; Wylie: rgyal-yongs las-rtags) maintains several elements of the flag of Bhutan, with slightly different artistry, and contains much Buddhist symbolism.

The emblem was designed by a Mongolian artist, commissioned by Ashi Tashi Dorji, the sister of the Queen Grandmother. The Dorji (Sanskrit: Vajra) was a weapon used by Guru Rinpoche to quell evil spirits.

The official description of the emblem is as follows:

"The national emblem, contained in a circle, is composed of a double diamond-thunderbolt (dorje) placed above a lotus, surmounted by a jewel and framed by two dragons. The thunderbolt represents the harmony between secular and religious power. The lotus symbolizes purity; the jewel expresses sovereign power; and the two dragons, male and female, stand for the name of the country which they proclaim with their great voice, the thunder." It is also known for its symbolic colors of the emblem with the gold, teal, red etc.

See also
Flag of Bhutan
National anthem of Bhutan
National symbols of Bhutan
Emblem of Tibet

References

http://www.kingdomofbhutan.com/kingdom/kingdom_2_.html
"National Symbols", National Portal of Bhutan

National symbols of Bhutan
Bhutan
Bhutan